Rick Stream (born February 23, 1949) is an American, former budget/project manager for the United States Department of Defense and a Republican member of the Missouri House of Representatives. He has represented the 90th district, which includes parts of St. Louis County, since 2013 and currently serves as chairman of the budget committee. Prior to redistricting he represented the 94th district from 2007 to 2013.

Early life and career
Rick Stream graduated from Kirkwood High School in 1967. He then went to St. Louis Community College–Meramec where he obtained an Associate degree in business. He also received a Bachelor of Science in Business Administration from University of Missouri–St. Louis in 1971. He then served as an officer in the United States Navy from 1971 to 1975. In 1977, he started his career at the United States Department of Defense where he was a budget and project manager until 2006. Stream is married, has four children, and attends Greentree Community Church in Kirkwood.

Political career
Rick Stream was on the Kirkwood School Board from 1992 to 2004 and was its chairman for two years. In 2006, he was elected to serve in the Missouri House of representatives over Democrat Jane Bogetto. He was reelected three times over Democrat Deb Lavender. He currently serves as the chairman of the budget committee.

Committee assignments
Joint Committee on Legislative Research
Joint Committee on Capital Improvements and Leases Oversight
Joint Legislative Committee on Court Automation
Budget (Chairman)
Leadership for Missouri Issue Development

Electoral history

References

External links 
 Official Missouri House of Representatives profile
 Interest Group Ratings
 Campaign Finance Information
 

Republican Party members of the Missouri House of Representatives
Living people
Politicians from St. Louis
University of Missouri–St. Louis alumni
1949 births